Chaudhry Zafar Iqbal Nagra is a Pakistani politician who was a Member of the Provincial Assembly of the Punjab, from 2008 to May 2018 and again from August 2018 till January 2023.

Early life and education
He was born in Faisalabad.

He graduated in 2002 from University of the Punjab and has a degree of Bachelor of Arts.

Political career
He was elected to the Provincial Assembly of the Punjab as a candidate of Pakistan Muslim League (N) (PML-N) from Constituency PP-64 (Faisalabad-XIV) in 2008 Pakistani general election. He received 32,635 votes and defeated Jehanzeb Imtiaz Gill, a candidate of Pakistan Peoples Party (PPP).

He was re-elected to the Provincial Assembly of the Punjab as an independent candidate from Constituency PP-64 (Faisalabad-XIV) in 2013 Pakistani general election. He received 55,789 votes and defeated Kashif Nawaz, a candidate of PML-N. He joined PML-N in May 2013.

He was re-elected to Provincial Assembly of the Punjab as a candidate of PML-N from Constituency PP-109 (Faisalabad-XIII) in 2018 Pakistani general election.

References

Living people
Punjab MPAs 2013–2018
Pakistan Muslim League (N) MPAs (Punjab)
Punjab MPAs 2008–2013
Punjab MPAs 2018–2023
Year of birth missing (living people)